John Clark ( – January 2011) was an English professional rugby league footballer who played in the 1950s and 1960s. He played at club level for Castleford (Heritage No. 439), Wigan (Heritage No. 635), and Warrington (Heritage No. 658).

Playing career

County League appearances
John Clark played in Castleford's victory in the Yorkshire League during the 1964–65 season.

Club career
John Clark made his début for Warrington in the victory over Wigan on 13 November 1965, and played his last game for Warrington on 23 December 1967, after a knee injury ended his career.

References

External links
Search for "Clark" at rugbyleagueproject.org
Statistics at wigan.rlfans.com
(archived by web.archive.org) Statistics at wolvesplayers.thisiswarrington.co.uk

1940s births
2011 deaths
Castleford Tigers players
English rugby league players
Place of birth missing
Rugby league locks
Rugby league players from Lancashire
Rugby league props
Warrington Wolves players
Wigan Warriors players
Year of birth uncertain